New York Slick is an album by bassist Ron Carter which was recorded at Van Gelder Studio in 1979 and released on the Milestone label the following year.

Track listing
All compositions by Ron Carter.
 "NY Slick" – 4:04
 "A Slight Smile" – 4:19
 "Tierra Española" – 8:48
 "Aromatic" – 8:53
 "Alternate Route" – 9:35

Personnel
Ron Carter – bass
Art Farmer – flugelhorn
J. J. Johnson – trombone
Hubert Laws – flute
Kenny Barron – piano
Billy Cobham – drums
Jay Berliner – acoustic guitar (track 3) 
Ralph MacDonald – percussion (track 3)

References

Milestone Records albums
Ron Carter albums
1980 albums
Albums recorded at Van Gelder Studio